Jackrabbits are hares, mammals in the same family as rabbits. The word comes from a contraction of "jackass rabbit", which derives from their long ears looking as though they belonged to a donkey.

Six species from western North America whose common names include the word "jackrabbit":
 Antelope jackrabbit
 Black-tailed jackrabbit
 White-sided jackrabbit
 Tehuantepec jackrabbit
 Black jackrabbit
 White-tailed jackrabbit

Jack rabbit or Jackrabbit may also refer to:

Arts and entertainment
 Jackrabbit, a 2015 San Fermin album
 A song from the album Have One On Me by Joanna Newsom
 Jackrabbit (film), a 2015 American cyberpunk film
 Jack Rabbit (Kennywood), a roller coaster near Pittsburgh, Pennsylvania, United States
 Jack Rabbit (Seabreeze), a roller coaster in Irondequoit, New York, United States
 Jack Rabbit (Celebration City), a roller coaster in Kissimmee, Florida, United States, renamed Hurricane
 Jack Rabbit or rabbit vibrator, a sex toy

Computer-related items 
 Apache Jackrabbit, a Java-based content repository
 JackRabbit Beta, now JumpUp website of Intuit
 Jazz Jackrabbit, a game series

People
 Jackrabbit, nickname of Herman Smith-Johannsen (1875–1987), Norwegian skier and supercentenarian
 Janoris Jenkins (born 1998), American National Football League cornerback nicknamed "Jackrabbit"

Places
 Jackrabbit, Arizona, United States, a former mining community
 Jackrabbit Ecological Reserve, Quebec, Canada

Sports
 South Dakota State Jackrabbits, the athletics teams of South Dakota State University
 Kokomo Jackrabbits, a college summer baseball team based in Kokomo, Indiana
 Jackrabbits, the athletics teams of Lonoke High School, Lonoke, Arkansas
 Jackrabbits, the athletics teams of Victor Valley High School, Victorville, California, United States

Other uses
 Jack Rabbit Trading Post, Joseph City, Arizona, a convenience store and curio shop

See also
 "Jackrabbiting," rapid acceleration from a stopped position with a motor vehicle

Animal common name disambiguation pages
Lists of people by nickname